"Good Lovin" is a song recorded by Swedish singer Benjamin Ingrosso. The song was released as a digital download in Sweden on 25 February 2017 and peaked at number 11 on the Swedish Singles Chart. It took part in Melodifestivalen 2017, and qualified to the final from the second semi-final on 11 February 2017. It was written by Ingrosso, Louis Schoorl, Matt Parad, and MAG. "Good Lovin'" was certified platinum in Sweden.

Music video
A music video to accompany the release of "Good Lovin'" was first released onto YouTube on 1 March 2017 at a total length of two minutes and fifty-nine seconds.

Track listing

Chart performance

Weekly charts

Certifications

Release history

References

2017 singles
2016 songs
English-language Swedish songs
Melodifestivalen songs of 2017
Swedish pop songs
Songs written by Louis Schoorl
Benjamin Ingrosso songs
Songs written by Benjamin Ingrosso